The Bloor Homes Eastleigh Classic was a women's professional golf tournament on the Ladies European Tour. It was first played in 1984 and held annually until 1991.

The tournament was played on the par–65 (34–31) municipal course Fleming Park GC, Eastleigh, Hampshire, England, which closed permanently in 2008.

Jane Connachan recorded a 58 in the first round and Dale Reid recorded a 58 in the final round of the 1991 tournament, Ladies European Tour records as lowest rounds, as is Dale Reid's 1991 and Trish Johnson's 1990 72–hole raw score of 249.

Winners

See also
Ladies European Tour records

References

External links
Ladies European Tour

Bloor Homes Eastleigh Classic
Golf tournaments in England
Recurring sporting events established in 1984
Recurring sporting events disestablished in 1991
Defunct sports competitions in England